Nash Entertainment is a reality television and feature film production company.  Founded in 1994 by Bruce Nash, the first production under its name was Before They Were Stars.  The company is located at Sunset Gower Studios in Hollywood, California.  It has 14 corporate employees and approximately 250 production employees.

Television programs

Television specials
 50 Years of Soaps: An All-Star Celebration (1994)
 TV's All-Time Favorites (1995)
 Television's Funniest Performances (1995)
 The Secret World of Dreams (1995)
 WOW! The Most Awesome Acts on Earth (1996)
 Greatest Sports Moments of All Time (1996)
 You Gotta See This! (1996)
 Real Funny (1996)
 The World's Deadliest Volcanoes (1997)
 World's Most Daring Rescues (1997)
 Adventures with the Duchess (1997)
 World's Scariest Police Shootouts (1997)
 Behind the Laughs: The Unauthorized Stories of  Television's Greatest Comedies (1998)
 Exposed! Pro Wrestling's Greatest Secrets (1998)
 When Good Pets Go Bad (1998)
 World's Deadliest Sea Creatures (1998)
 Prisoners Out of Control (1998)
 World's Worst Drivers Caught on Tape (1998)
 World's Deadliest Earthquakes (1999)
 World's Deadliest Storms (1999)
 When Good Pets Go Bad II (1999)
 World's Scariest Ghosts Caught on Tape (2000)
 The First Family's Holiday Gift to America: A Personal Tour of the White House (2000)
 Cheating Spouses Caught on Tape (2001)
 Conspiracy Theory: Did We Land on the Moon? (2001)
 Glutton Bowl (2002)

References

External links
 
Television production companies of the United States
Entertainment companies based in California
Companies based in Los Angeles
Entertainment companies established in 1994
1994 establishments in California